The Song Is You is a live album by saxophonist Stan Getz which was released on the Laserlight label in 1996.

Reception

The AllMusic review by Michael G. Nastos stated "The Song Is You is a missing link between a less than successful teaming with Bill Evans, and the more modern quartet music Getz played thereafter with Corea, Jimmy Rowles, Joanne Brackeen, or Kenny Barron. It's a very worthwhile item to own if you search for it, well recorded and performed by a group that could collectively be the most purely talented of any you might find who ever backed up Stan Getz".

Track listing
 "The Song Is You" (Jerome Kern, Oscar Hammerstein II) - 5:51
 "O Grande Amor" (Antônio Carlos Jobim, Vinícius de Moraes) - 6:02
 "For Jane" (Jack DeJohnette) - 3:22
 "Dane's Chant" (Stanley Cowell) - 7:36
 "Major General" (DeJohnette) - 6:32
 "Folk Tune for Bass" (Miroslav Vitous) - 5:10
 "Tonight I Shall Sleep/Desafinado" (Duke Ellington, Irving Gordon/Jobim, Newton Mendonça) - 13:08
 "All the Things You Are" (Kern, Hammerstein) - 6:50
 "Summer Night" (Jobim) - 3:42
 "One Note Samba" (Jobim, Mendonça) - 1:58

Personnel 
Stan Getz - tenor saxophone
Stanley Cowell - piano
Miroslav Vitous - bass
Jack DeJohnette - drums

References 

1996 live albums
Stan Getz live albums